Guar hydroxypropyltrimonium chloride is an organic compound that is a water-soluble quaternary ammonium derivative of guar gum. It gives conditioning properties to shampoos and after-shampoo hair care products. The effects of the cationic charge density, guar concentration in aqueous solution, and treatment time on bleached European hair have been studied. A mechanical testing method has been successfully applied to determine the efficacy of cationic guars to improve the ease of combing. The results were confirmed in a shampoo formulation on both virgin and bleached hair.

References

Cleaning products
Household chemicals
Quaternary ammonium compounds